There are 37 state parks in the U.S. state of West Virginia . The West Virginia Division of Natural Resources (WVDNR) Parks and Recreation Section is the governing body for all 37 state parks and directly operates all but one of them. In addition to state parks, the WVDNR Parks and Recreation Section governs eight state forests.

The first West Virginia state park, Droop Mountain Battlefield, was acquired in 1928 and dedicated in 1929; and the newest state parks, Stonewall Jackson Lake and North Bend Rail Trail, were opened in 1990 and 1991, respectively. Four parks that later joined the state park system were established prior to Droop Mountain, the earliest being the Point Pleasant Monument (now Tu-Endie-Wei) in 1901. There are seven former West Virginia state parks: one state park was transferred to the National Park Service (NPS), one to the West Virginia Division of Culture and History, one to the West Virginia Division of Highways, and one to a municipality, and three have ceased to exist entirely.

This list provides an overview of West Virginia state parks and a brief history of their development and governance since the first state park was dedicated in 1929. Of the 37 state parks governed by the WVDNR Parks and Recreation Section, 10 are lodge/resort state parks, 25 are cabin, camping, and day-use state parks, and 2 are rail trails.

Overview 

West Virginia's state parks are governed by the West Virginia Division of Natural Resources (WVDNR) Parks and Recreation Section, which is under the jurisdiction of the West Virginia Department of Commerce.

There are state parks in 30 of West Virginia's 55 counties with Pocahontas County having the most at five. WVDNR divides the state into six regional districts to administer its state parks, forests, and wildlife management areas. Four state parks have U.S. Army Corps of Engineers (USACE) dams or reservoirs: Beech Fork, Bluestone, Stonewall Jackson Lake, and Tygart Lake. Nine state parks feature New Deal-era buildings and structures completed between 1933 and 1942; Lost River has the most with 78. Cathedral is the only state park designated a National Natural Landmark, and Grave Creek Mound is the only state park to have ever been designated a National Historic Landmark. Stonewall Jackson Lake is the first and only West Virginia state park to be developed, constructed, financed, and operated through a public–private partnership.

, the WVDNR Parks and Recreation Section directly employed more than 400 full-time and around 1,000 seasonal and summer employees who serviced approximately 7.1million visitors (65% state residents and 35% out-of-state). In 2016, visitors to state parks and forests spent $226.5million throughout the state, of which 46% ($103.6million) was spent by out-of-state visitors. The total economic activity attributed to visitors of state parks and forests in 2016 totaled between $213.4million and $248.7million.

History 

West Virginia's lumber and mineral exploitation had caused tremendous damage to much of its natural environment by the early 20thcentury. The state recognized the need to designate and protect lands worthy of conservation, and in 1925 the West Virginia Legislature established the West Virginia State Forest, Park and Conservation Commission to assess the state's opportunities and needs for forests, parks, game preserves, and recreational areas. West Virginia's state park system began to take shape in January of that year, when the Commission purchased land in Pocahontas County for a wildlife and timber preserve that later developed into Watoga.

In their report to the Legislature in 1927, the Commission recommended that scenic natural areas be acquired and administered by a State Park System under the State Game and Fish Commission and that historical monuments be administered by a State Monuments System. They also identified a list of potential scenic and historic state park sites. One of these recommended sites became West Virginia's first state park, Droop Mountain Battlefield, also in Pocahontas County. The park was acquired in 1928 and dedicated on July4, 1929, to commemorate one of the largest battles in West Virginia during the American Civil War. Four other historic locations recommended by the Commission had already been established and would later become state parks; the earliest of these was the Point Pleasant Monument (now Tu-Endie-Wei), which had been acquired by the state in 1901 and dedicated in 1909.

The Legislature established the West Virginia Conservation Commission Division of State Parks in 1933 to manage the state's growing park system, and to leverage the resources and expertise of the National Park Service (NPS), Civilian Conservation Corps (CCC), Works Progress Administration (WPA), and other New Deal-era programs for further park development. By 1945, the Division of State Parks had expanded to 13 state parks with the addition of its first USACE reservoir park at Tygart Lake. Because African Americans were denied access to West Virginia's state parks and forests, the Division of State Parks created the only state park on the basis of racial segregation, Booker T. Washington State Park, in 1949. African Americans were restricted from the remainder of the state park and forest systems until the park and forest systems' integration following the Brown v. Board of Education decision by the United States Supreme Court in May 1954.

By 1950, the Division of State Parks was operating 16 state parks totaling  and by 1954, the state had expanded to 20 state parks totaling . That year, the NPS noted that West Virginia had made "large percentage gains" in adding refreshments facilities to its park system, which totaled 11. During the 1960s, the Economic Development Administration (EDA) federal loan program allowed the state to add three new parks to its system: Canaan Valley Resort, Pipestem Resort, and Twin Falls Resort. Visitors to West Virginia state parks and forests totaled 4.3million by 1968 and almost 5million in 1971. Following the Legislature's passing of the Economic Development Act of 1985, the West Virginia Division of Parks and Recreation was transferred from the West Virginia Conservation Commission to the West Virginia Department of Commerce, where it remains today. The most recent additions to the West Virginia state park system, Stonewall Jackson Lake and North Bend Rail Trail, were added in 1990 and 1991, respectively.

Current state parks

Former state parks

See also 

 List of West Virginia state forests
 List of West Virginia wildlife management areas
 West Virginia Division of Natural Resources
 West Virginia State Wildlife Center

Explanatory notes

References

Bibliography

External links 
 

 
West Virginia
State parks
 
State parks